Eupithecia phulchokiana is a moth in the family Geometridae first described by Claude Herbulot in 1984. It is found in Nepal and Thailand.

References

Moths described in 1984
phulchokiana
Moths of Asia